Whisper Supremacy is the third studio album by Canadian technical death metal band Cryptopsy. It is the first album to feature vocalist Mike DiSalvo and the only album to feature guitarist Miguel Roy.

On the US release the band logo is in the upper left, whereas on the German (European) release it is larger and centred.

Track listing

Personnel

Cryptopsy
 Mike DiSalvo – vocals
 Jon Levasseur – guitars
 Miguel Roy – guitars
 Eric Langlois – bass guitar
 Flo Mounier – drums, backing vocals

Additional personnel
 François Quévillon – artwork, design, illustration
 Sébastien Bussières – engineering
 Pierre Rémillard – production
 Annie Grenier – photography
 Lord Worm – additional backing vocals on "Cold Hate, Warm Blood" and "Loathe"

References

Cryptopsy albums
1998 albums
Century Media Records albums